The Philomathean Literary Society of Erskine College is one of Erskine College's literary societies. The Philomelean Society is the sister organization and provides membership to women. Philomathean Hall is the oldest building in the Erskine College-Due West Historic District, located in Due West, South Carolina. Alumni members have risen to some of the highest legal positions in the United States. The Philomathean Literary Society at Erksine is the oldest Philomathean Society still operational in the state of South Carolina.

Backdrop

Literary societies were a feature of most American Colleges and Universities in the 19th century. They often existed in pairs so that they could compete for membership and hold debates. Additionally, they served to enhance the liberal arts programs of their schools through discussions on contemporary topics, hosting speakers, and maintaining libraries.

Literary societies in the United States existed as early as the 18th century. The American Whig–Cliosophic Society was in operation at Princeton in 1769 and the Union-Philanthropic Literary Society was in operation at Hampden-Sydney College in 1789. The North and South Carolina schools followed shortly. The Dialectic and Philanthropic Societies at the University of North Carolina were created in 1795 by a former member of Princeton's Whig Society. In 1806 the Euphradian Society and the Clariosophic Society opened at South Carolina College. In 1837 the Eumenean Society and the Philanthropic Society opened at Davidson College.

Philomathean is among the most common names chosen for a Society. Philomathean is derived from the Greek philomath, which means "a lover of learning." The oldest existent Philomathean Literary Society in the U.S. is the  Philomathean Society at the University of Pennsylvania.

Although Philomathean Literary Societies existed at South Carolina's other schools as early as the 19th century, they have since become defunct or rechartered. Robert Barnwell delivered an oration before the Beaufort Philomathean Society in 1803 to commemorate Independence Day. There was also a Society in Charleston from 1828, it was chartered as Phi Mu in 1904.

History

The Associate Reformed Synod of the South was established in 1803 amidst scattered congregations.  Additionally, the Synod's heritage in Scottish churches and their well-educated clergy, led to the need for a seminary. In 1822 , two pastors were appointed to train ministerial candidates. The nascent seminary had no buildings, books, or money. So, when one pastor died in 1829 and the other left in 1831, the Synod moved to create a permanent institution. In 1836, the Clark and Erskine Seminary opened. John S. Pressly was the head of the seminary by 1839. When the seminary was established as the first four-year denominational college in South Carolina, Pressly resigned his position. Ebenezer Erskine Pressly had been a Professor of Divinity at the Erskine Theological Seminary since 1837 and pastor of the Due West Associate Reformed Presbyterian Church. He was thus selected to succeed as head of the school. Four years later, in 1843, the institution's name was shortened to Erskine College.

Literary societies followed the foundation of Erskine College almost upon its inception. As at other colleges, the literary societies served to provide training beyond the scope of the classroom in speech making, debating and literature. Their function was to enhance the reputation of the school's liberal arts focus and its prestige by sponsoring famous orators.

The Philomathean Literary Society of Erskine College was formed in 1842 when 12 senior students withdrew from the Euphemian Literary Society. The Philomathean society was conceived as a brother society to the Euphemians in order to facilitate debates traditional at other literary society and in the spirit of “iron sharpens iron” taken from Proverbs 27:17. Members of the faculty had participated in literary societies, especially at Miami University, and the tradition was consequently impressed upon students at Erskine.

Ebenezer Erskine Pressly had participated in Literary Societies throughout his education. He attended Miami University in Oxford, Ohio in 1824, where he graduated after 2 years at the age of 18. E.E. Pressly was a member of the Erodelphian Literary Society. In 1827, the Erodelphians, with the Miami Union Literary Society, issued the first collegiate publication west of the Appalachians.

The two Erskine Societies initially met in the college's main building with the Euphemians on the second floor and the Philomatheans on the third floor. Each society was responsible for its own hall and library. These libraries were initially the only ones available at the College.

The societies became the center of the social and cultural life of the campus in the 1850s. Weekly meetings and annual exhibitions were held in the shared hall. Every Friday afternoon, the societies held declamations followed with debates in the evening. The highlights of campus life were the Junior Exhibitions, which were social events with young women and members of the community in attendance, and the annual summer commencements, which featured acclaimed orators. The two Societies competed for prestige in honoring commencement orators and politicians with membership.

During the 19th century, many notable American politicians, theologians and philosophers delivered addresses to the Philomathean Society. In 1844, Benjamin Franklin Perry delivered a speech, published 43 years later by his wife. In 1846, James Lawrence Orr delivered an address at Philomathean Hall which was subsequently published by the Society. The first moderator of the Presbyterian Church, Benjamin M. Palmer, spoke in 1854.

In 1844, the argument over the selection of a commencement orator resulted in the most tragic event of the College's history. In Philomathean Hall, Philomathean Peter K. Thompson was murdered by Euphemian Samuel Miller. The faculty issued an explanation to the local paper:

"Mr. Editor:
A most melancholy occurrence transpired in this place, on the evening of the 6th inst. We allude to an affray between two of the students, Samuel Miller and Peter K. Thompson, which resulted in the death of the latter. To prevent misconception and correct exaggerated reports, we send you a statement of the principal facts in the case. The fatal affair occurred in the hall of the Philomathean Society. At the meeting on last Friday, Mr. Miller, it seems, took offence [sic] at the conduct of Mr. Thompson, during the deliberations of the evening. Immediately after the adjournment of the society some angry words were passed, which resulted in a contest, and the event was the death of Mr. Thompson. It was found to have been occasioned by two stabs inflicted, one on the left side, near the region of the heart, and the other about the abdomen. Mr. Thompson expired in fifteen or twenty minutes after a separation was effected. The wounds were inflicted by a pocket knife, with a blade about three and a half inches in length. The whole affair occupied a period, not, perhaps exceeding half a minute. Mr. Miller has been taken into custody, and the matter is under the process of judicial investigation, which forbids that anything should be said which might be prejudicial to either of the parties. We hope, therefore, that the public will suspend their opinion respecting the whole transaction till all the evidence is brought forward in open court.
By authority of the Faculty"

Miller was subsequently sentenced to 12 months in prison and fined 1000 dollars.

This incident lead to the chartering of the two societies. The Philomathean Literary Society received its charter under the State of South Carolina in 1852.

From 1854-1861, the Euphemian and Philomathean Literary Societies cooperated in the editing and printing of the Erskine Collegiate Recorder. The magazine was the only publication from the college other than the annual catalogs. The content was more or less devoid of politics or social commentary. Instead the Recorder was almost entirely composed of literary essays.

The year the American Civil War ended, too few students enrolled at Erskine to maintain both societies. From 1865-67 they operated jointly as the Adelphian Society, alternating meetings between the Euphemian and Philomathean Halls. The two societies resumed separate operations before the first degree after the Civil War was conferred.

In 1912, the college adopted the Darlington Cup as the award for the school's society debates. The trophy is made of sterling silver from Tiffany & Co. The donation was granted by Philomathean alumnus J. J. Darlington.

1957 saw the establishment of the Philomelean Society at Erskine. Philomelean is Greek for 'lover of poetry'.

The Philomathean Literary Society is associated with several of Erskine College's awards. On an annual basis, the Society recognizes a member of the faculty or staff with the “Man of the Year Award”. The “James Steven Henderson Memorial Scholarship” is awarded in memory of a 1979 graduate with preference given to members of the society.

Articles and organization

The Philomathean and Philomelean Societies operate as Parliaments under Robert's Rules of Order. Each society has adopted individual constitutions under which it appoints officers and grants those officers authority.

In the preamble to the Philomathean constitution, the purpose of the Society is stated as: “The order of mutual benefits derived from the aesthetic expressions of logic, eloquence, and the promotion of the social and cultural aspirations”. The Philomelean constitution carries a similar preamble.

The officers consist of a President, Vice-President, Recording Secretary, Corresponding Secretary and Treasurer. The Philomelean Society carries a similar composition of officers except for the addition of a Chaplain and only one Secretary. The President is required to appoint a Parliamentarian, Historian and Docket Secretary. Furthermore, the President is required to appoint a Tribunal to make determinations concerning infractions. The President is vested with executive powers. Philomathean officers are elected for a term of one year; they must be of at least sophomore standing and have two semesters remaining before graduation.

Additionally, the society has a number of standing committees. These are as follows:

Constitution Committee
Rush Committee
Finance Committee
Service Committee
Social Committee
Debate Committee

The committees differ in the Philomelean Society. These are as follows:

Program Committee
Social Committee
House Committee
Publicity Committee
Projects Committee
Alumni Committee
Inter-Society Committee

Decisions are made by a quorum that must consist of one-half plus one of the current active membership of the society, while orders of the day may be determined by those present. Legislation in the Philomathean Society can only be changed with two-thirds in support.

Infractions are divided into major and minor offenses and differ between the Philomathean and Philomelean Societies.

Minor Offenses in the Philomathean Society include:

Feet propped on chairs
Leaning back in chairs
Destruction of property
Cluttering up the Hall
Speaking without being recognized by the chair
Coming late to meetings
Failing to carry out duties
Failing to attend call meetings
Not sitting in a chair
Pulling a chair out from under a member
Other offenses deemed worthy by the Tribunal

While Major Offenses are defined as "any offense which jeopardizes the reputation or standards of the Philomathean Literary Society." Such offenses are determined through consultation of the Executive officers and assessed by the Tribunal.

In the Philomelean Society Minor Offenses are as follow:

Failure to stand and address the chair
Unnecessary noise
Being late to meetings

While Major Offenses include:

Improper dress (not wearing jerseys, not dressing for dress meetings)
Unexcused absences from regular events- other than regularly scheduled meetings

Major offenses result in a fine, failure to appear before court merits a fine per docket offense.

Members may request that they be considered inactive for up to one semester. They must provide a legitimate reason to the President, and receive a majority vote in their favor. Upon their return they must present a letter to the society indicating their intention to return to activity.

Activities

In the past, the Philomathean Society provided training in declamation, essay writing, oratory and debating. These skills were tested in competitions. Lower class members could win medals in declamation and essay writing, while upper class members could win for oratory and debate. The society still participates in the inter-society debate with the Euphemians for the J. J. Darlington Cup.

The society meets weekly. In years past, the meeting was held on Fridays; the afternoon was reserved for essays and declamations, while the evening was used for debates. Additionally, each member prepared two speeches during the school year. Senior members were presented with sheep-skin diplomas, and members were awarded medals for
excellence.

In addition, the society organizes several social functions throughout the year. Some events are organized with the assistance of the Philomelean Society. Specific events have changed since the founding of the society, with new traditions established in place of the old. Alumni accompany Philo women dressed as alumni to join candidate members at an open meeting held early in the school year. This tradition is called the Smoker and intends to expose candidates to the operation of meetings and the advantages of graduating as a member. The Philomeleans host a Halloween costume party, called the Scary Party. A Formal has been held since 1979, when it was first hosted at the Greenwood Country Club. First-year members prepare and serve a breakfast at midnight for Senior members at the Midnight Breakfast. The society hosts two events that celebrate American history, the pre-Gay '90s semi-Formal and the Gay '90s outdoor party. The latter is often held at a nearby lake in spring and celebrates the prosperity of the 1890s, a period that saw the North and South reconcile after undergoing Reconstruction. The Society holds a celebration in the second semester. Finally, at commencement the Philomathean and Euphemian Societies hold a joint celebration.

The Philomathean and Philomelean members celebrate their members marital engagements. Members of the Philomathean Society "serenade" engaged Philo women by standing outside her window and singing. During the '70s a book of songs existed that has since fallen into disuse. Philomeleans slide notes under the doors of their membership inviting them to a "Candle-Lighting". At the time designated by the note, Philo women gather and sing Tell Me Why while passing a burning candle in a circle. When the candle reaches the engaged women on the second round of the circle, she blows it out and announces her engagement.

Membership

Membership to the Philomathean Society is open to all male students of Erskine College. Women may apply after their first semester to the Philomelean Society. Members are collectively known as “philo”.

The societies have different traditions for inducting new members. Each society is individually responsible for establishing its own membership committee and for the events held during the admission period.

Students who apply for membership to the Philomathean or Philomelean Societies must complete the tasks assigned by the membership committee in a two-week period at the beginning of the school year called Rush. Before a student is allowed to apply to the Philomelean Society, she must attend at least two open events. Philomathean potentials also need to qualify for rushee status. Candidates must attend a social event called a Smoker, after which the standing membership votes on each potential rushee. Once the candidate has been voted into Rush, he/she is assigned a sponsor. Freshmen and transfer students are ineligible during their first semester.

At the beginning of Rush, candidates are placed under a sponsor and given a file of instructions. The Philomelean candidates are required to wear a name tag throughout Rush. In the Philomathean Society, rushees are given a pin and a Rush name that is not to be used outside of the society. During Rush, potential candidates are required to follow a number of traditions and meet several objectives. The candidate must learn the names of all Philomathean Brothers or Philomelean Sisters and acquire their signatures. Tradition holds that the signatures of senior students should be sought first, out of respect. Signatures are often granted only once a requested deed or favor is performed by the candidate.

Candidates may only miss two events during Rush. Additionally, candidates are required to organize at least one event, a fundraiser, on their own. There are several permanent events during the Rush period. The Philomelean Society holds a poetry night where the candidates must recite a poem in a dramatic fashion. Both Societies require a Constitution Test that measures knowledge of Robert's Rules of Order and the laws of the society. The Philomathean Society conducts a History Test; candidates must exceed 60% to be considered, though anything less than 90% is usually insufficient. Philomelean rushees must do something for their sponsors on Sponsor Day. The Rush Party allows members from both societies to mingle. Philomathean candidates must attend three regular meetings in coat and tie. Both societies have a Cook-Out. Accompanying activities vary between the two, although the event is attended by both societies. Philomeleans must wear a tuxedo-jacket with tie and serve their sponsor at the Cook-Out. The Philomatheans organize the Cook-Out, which consists of an outdoor bonfire with a pig roasted and served by the rushees.

Finally on Vote Night, the potential Philomelean candidates must provide their signature list, a letter to the society thanking it for the opportunity to participate in Rush and wear a themed costume. Philomathean rushees are required to give a speech, and sponsors must report on a number of the rushees' qualities, personality traits, and past achievements.

Alumni retain their membership in the societies and the privileges accorded to members. They are not expected to pay dues.

Motto and letters

The motto is the Latin "Tentare Est Valere", or "To try is to be worthy", along with the letters 'N' 'D', which stand for "Nil Desperandum", or "Despair in no way". The letters are derived from Horace's Odes. The motto and letters read together illustrate the classical liberal arts and Christian educational aspirations of the college. The motto is similar to a number of passages in the Bible, such as Luke 13:24, which state that worth is the result of careful conduct and agonizing effort. Moreover, the letters reinforce the New Testament notion of worth through a classical theme. Teucer undergoes a voyage of discovery and personal suffering, finally establishing the city of Salamis. The theme of his speech is further reinforced by valere, which is also used as a parting phrase. A broad translation of valere also signifies strength, power, and wellness.

The letters of the Society are Alpha (Adelphos-Brotherhood); Alpha (Areta- Virtue); Sigma (Sophia- Wisdom); Epsilon (Elpis- Hope); and Sigma (Sophrosuna- Self-Control). The letters offer a code of conduct that reinforces the themes established by the motto. First, brotherhood recalls the core purpose of the society, but revisits the story of Teucer who was sent into exile because he failed to honor his brother's death. Virtue recalls biblical passages similar to the motto, advising conduct that follows the example of Christ. Wisdom returns to the motto, playing on one of the meanings of tentare, to prove or to test. Hope reiterates Nil Desperandum. And, self-control recalls the biblical influences of the motto.

Philomathean Hall

The Philomathean Hall is the oldest building in the Erskine College-Due West Historic District. As such, it is a contributing property in the National Register of Historic Places. It was constructed in 1859, under the direction of architect Thomas Veal. The building was constructed in the Italian Renaissance Revival style. The two-story stuccoed building features Corinthian pilasters, a pedimented pavilion, recessed balustrades and a Palladian window. The Hall demonstrates the influence of  Andrea Palladio as it bears close resemblance to the Villa Capra "La Rotonda" and the Villa Porto (Vivaro di Dueville). Palladio's geometrically formulaic design is echoed in the Philomathean Hall's 50x40 footprint, symmetrically placed windows and interior floor plan that conforms to the windows exterior placement. The open second floor meeting hall celebrates this geometry with its painted high ceiling, flanking fireplaces, and 14 symmetrically placed windows, while the downstairs rooms are dimensioned to match the window placement, a schematic that still challenges contemporary architects. The architectural similarities between the Hall and colonial American buildings, such as those at Mount Vernon, Monticello, and the White House, are thematic of the early 19th century. Additionally, the Hall is aesthetically tied to other South Carolina buildings. It possesses characteristics similar to those found in Hibernian Hall and Drayton Hall. Leaks in the internal gutter have caused significant damage to the jewel-box painting on the ceiling of the great hall on the second floor, which was added in the 1912 J.J. Darlington renovation. The ceiling and wall frescoes were painted by Italian painter Alfredo Lanzer.

Notable Philomatheans

Joseph Neely Miller (1848-after 1904) - a prominent lawyer and active member of the Democratic organization. Was chosen for the presidential ticket.

J.J. Darlington (1849–1920)- was a Washington based lawyer. A Diana statue in Judiciary Square stands in memorial to him. Darlington was a lawyer for the respondent in Gompers v. Buck's Stove and Range Co., a prominent case regarding the First Amendment rights of workers and laborers organized in unions. Additionally, Darlington served on the Erskine board of trustees.

Leo Hill (1927–2010) - served as president of the Philomathean Literary Society. In 1968, Hill was elected as the President of the South Carolina Bar at the age of 41, making him the youngest to obtain the post. He is credited with modernizing South Carolina's bond laws and creating the state's Public Defender and Legal Services Agencies. Additionally, Hill served as South Carolina Supreme Court appointee to the state Judicial Council, as secretary to the Greenville County Democratic Party and as City Attorney and Special Counsel.

Kent D. Talbert- served as president of the Erskine Student Government Association. He was nominated in 2005 by President Bush to serve as General Counsel to the U.S. Department of Education.

John C. Calhoun and James Lawrence Orr were both made honorary members of the Society.

Works cited

External links
Erskine College Philomathean Literary Society Page

College literary societies in the United States
Student societies in the United States
Erskine College